The Willard Carpenter House, located at 405 Carpenter Street in downtown Evansville, Indiana, is one of two landmarks recognized as memorials to one of the city's most influential pioneers, philanthropist Willard Carpenter. The other is Willard Library which he built, endowed and gave to the people of the area.  Willard Carpenter, born on March 15, 1803, at Strafford, Orange County, Vermont, was a son of Willard, Sr., and Polly (Bacon) Carpenter, and a descendant of the noted Rehoboth Carpenter family.

Construction on Willard Carpenter's house, an early Evansville mansion, began in 1848 and was completed in 1849. It is a two-story, Greek Revival style dwelling constructed by local "mechanics" including carpenter Gottlieb Bippus and masons Knoll and Tenford. The brick for the 21" thick walls was made close by while other materials were brought down the Ohio River from Lawrenceburg, Indiana. Furniture was purchased by the Carpenters in New York and shipped to Evansville via New Orleans.

When built the Carpenter house was one of three conspicuous Evansville landmarks (the Robert Barnes residence and the State Bank were the other two, both now demolished) and people came from many miles to view it. Its format of block massing, low hip roof with a deck and Greek Revival motifs (Doric-ordered portico, entablature with frieze board pierced by rectangular window, eaves dentil molding and roof cornice) are very similar to examples found in other Ohio River towns, notably Vevay and Madison, and are suggestive of New England heritage.

The home passed from Carpenter ownership in the Depression years when the property was purchased by Funkhouser American Legion Post. In 1956, they sold the property to WTVW. Medco purchased the mansion in 1974 and restored the home to as close to original condition as possible. Medco stayed in the home until 1985, when it was purchased by WNIN (TV).  It now also houses the offices of WNIN-FM.

It was added to the National Register of Historic Places in 1978.

References

External links

Historic American Buildings Survey in Indiana
Houses on the National Register of Historic Places in Indiana
Houses completed in 1849
Greek Revival houses in Indiana
Georgian Revival architecture in Indiana
1849 establishments in Indiana
Houses in Evansville, Indiana
National Register of Historic Places in Evansville, Indiana